The Rexburg Stake Tabernacle, also known as the Fremont Stake Tabernacle is a building located in Rexburg, Idaho that formerly served as tabernacle for large gatherings of members of the Church of Jesus Christ of Latter-day Saints. The tabernacle was designed by architect Otto Erlandsen and completed in 1911 at a cost of $31,000.  The building was listed on the National Register of Historic Places in 1974.  In 1980 the building was sold to the city of Rexburg and now serves as a civic center and is home of the Rexburg Children's Choir.

In 2020, the Rexburg Tabernacle was visible to a nationwide audience when NBC Nightly News and Inside Edition highlighted the children's choir's ability to persist during the COVID-19 pandemic.

See also
 List of National Historic Landmarks in Idaho
 National Register of Historic Places listings in Madison County, Idaho

Notes

External links

1911 establishments in Idaho
20th-century Latter Day Saint church buildings
Buildings and structures in Madison County, Idaho
Former churches in Idaho
Former Latter Day Saint religious buildings and structures
Churches on the National Register of Historic Places in Idaho
Churches completed in 1911
Romanesque Revival architecture in Idaho
National Register of Historic Places in Madison County, Idaho